Mary Spencer (born December 12, 1984) is a Canadian boxer who competes as a 75 kilogram middleweight. She has won three World Championships, one Pan American Games gold medal, and eight Canadian Championships. Spencer's athletic career started early competing in multiple sports as a child including; Basketball, Volleyball, Soccer, and Track and field. Spencer began serious boxing training in 2002 and now trains at the Windsor Amateur Boxing Club under Coach Charlie Stewart. As of July 26, 2011, her amateur record is 115 wins, 9 losses. Spencer was born in Wiarton, Ontario and currently lives in Windsor, Ontario. She is a member of the Chippewas of Nawash Unceded First Nation.

Women's boxing was a part of the Olympic Games program for the first time in London in 2012. Spencer obtained an endorsement deal with CoverGirl. The company has donated more than $140,000 to support her in her quest for gold in London 2012 Summer Olympics  Spencer was considered a medal favourite, and one of Canada's best hopes in women's boxing.  She lost her first bout to China's Li Jinzi. She was an Indspire Award recipient in the sports category in 2014. Spencer was awarded the 2019 Randy Starkman Award by the Canadian Olympic Committee.

Professional boxing record

References

External links

Mary Spencer at womenboxing.com

1984 births
Canadian women boxers
Boxers at the 2011 Pan American Games
Boxers at the 2012 Summer Olympics
Living people
Ojibwe people
People from Bruce County
Boxing people from Ontario
Sportspeople from Windsor, Ontario
Pan American Games gold medalists for Canada
Olympic boxers of Canada
First Nations sportspeople
AIBA Women's World Boxing Championships medalists
Indspire Awards
Pan American Games medalists in boxing
Chippewas of Nawash Unceded First Nation
Middleweight boxers
Medalists at the 2011 Pan American Games
First Nations women
First Nations sportswomen